Ģirts Lilienfelds (born 4 December 1982) is a Latvian handball player for HSC 2000 Coburg and the Latvian national team.

He represented Latvia at the 2020 European Men's Handball Championship.

References

External links

1982 births
Living people
Latvian male handball players
People from Dobele
Expatriate handball players
Latvian expatriate sportspeople in Germany
Handball-Bundesliga players